Anders Trondsen (born 30 March 1995) is a Norwegian professional footballer who plays as a left-back for Allsvenskan club IFK Göteborg.

Club career
Trondsen made his debut for Lillehammer FK in the 2011 Norwegian Second Division. In the autumn of 2011, he moved to attend the Norwegian College of Elite Sport in Bærum and play for Stabæk Fotball's youth team. He made his senior league debut for Stabæk in the loss against SK Brann in August 2012.

Trondsen signed for Sarpsborg 08 on 5 March 2015. On 14 August 2017, he signed for Rosenborg BK. He signed for Trabzonspor on 7 August 2020.

International career
Trondsen debuted for the Norway national team in a 2–1 2018 World Cup qualification loss to Czech Republic in November 2016.

Career statistics

Club

Honours

Club
Rosenborg
Eliteserien: 2017, 2018
Norwegian Football Cup: 2018

Trabzonspor
Süper Lig: 2021–22

References

External links 
 
 

1995 births
Living people
Sportspeople from Lillehammer
Association football midfielders
Norwegian footballers
Norway international footballers
Norway under-21 international footballers
Norway youth international footballers
Norwegian expatriate footballers
Stabæk Fotball players
Sarpsborg 08 FF players
Rosenborg BK players
Trabzonspor footballers
Eliteserien players
Norwegian First Division players
Norwegian Second Division players
Süper Lig players
Expatriate footballers in Turkey
Norwegian expatriate sportspeople in Turkey